The International School Hannover Region (ISHR) is a co-educational independent school located in the center of Hannover, Germany. ISHR is a 3k - Grade 12 school with students representing over 60 nationalities. Classes are taught in English with German lessons beginning in Grade 1, and multiple other languages offered in secondary school. About 40% of ISHR's students are German.

ISHR serves the multi-national community of the city of Hannover and its surrounding areas. ISHR is accredited by the Council of International Schools (CIS) and the New England Association of Schools and Colleges (NEASC) and belongs to the Association of German International Schools (AGIS). It is authorized to teach all three IB (International Baccalaureate) programs: the PYP, the MYP, and the IB Diploma. The school has the status of a recognised Ergänzungsschule.

History
ISHR was founded in 1996 with 67 students from 20 nations enrolled in seven grades. At the end of the 2017/2018 school year, the school enrolled over 600 students.

External links

 ISHR Website

International schools in Germany
International Baccalaureate schools in Germany